The Netherlands was represented by six-member group Teach-In, with the song "Ding-a-dong", at the 1975 Eurovision Song Contest, which took place in Stockholm on 22 March. Teach-In were chosen as the Dutch representatives at the national final on 26 February, and went on to win the 1975 contest for the Netherlands.

Before Eurovision

Nationaal Songfestival 1975 
The national final was held at the Jaarbeurs in Utrecht, hosted by Willem Duys. For the first time since 1970, the Dutch performer had not been preselected by broadcaster NOS, and the 1975 selection consisted of two stages. Firstly, each of the three participating acts performed a song and 5-member international jury voted for the best song; then the chosen song was performed by all three acts and a 100-member public jury voted for the act they wanted to perform it. Teach-In were chosen with over half of the public vote.

At Eurovision 
The free-language rule applied in 1975, so prior to the contest the song was translated into English as "Ding-a-dong" and performed in English at the final. On the night of the final Teach-In performed first in the running order, preceding Ireland. 1975 saw the introduction of the current Eurovision scoring system, and "Ding-a-dong" received six maximum 12 points votes from Israel, Malta, Norway, Spain, Sweden and the United Kingdom. At the close of voting it had received 152 points in total (with points from every other participating country), winning the contest by a 14-point margin over runners-up the United Kingdom. This was the Netherlands' fourth Eurovision victory. The Dutch jury awarded its 12 points to Luxembourg.

The Dutch conductor at the contest was Harry van Hoof.

This was the first time in Eurovision history that the contest was won by the song which had opened the show, although this would happen again with the United Kingdom the following year and Sweden in 1984.

"Ding-a-dong" reached number 3 on the Dutch Singles chart and also became a hit in several other markets, including the United Kingdom where it peaked at number 13, and Sweden where it made number 2.

Voting

References

External links 
 Dutch Preselection 1975

1975
Countries in the Eurovision Song Contest 1975
Eurovision